Saco Reinalda (chosen from 1150 to 1167) was a legendary potestaat of Friesland, now a province of the Netherlands. Sometimes his name was written as Rengnalda, his son was called Wilco Reinalda.

According to later and inaccurate sources, Saco Reinalda of Westernijtsjerk was twice Potestaat of Friesland, and had the right to save gold and silver coins (0. Sc, 27).

References
Friesche Almanak 1851
Beknopte geschiedenis van Friesland, in hoofdtrekken Wopke Eekhoff p 490
"wordt geroemd als een braaf en vredelievend man, onder wiens bestuur vele Friezen op nieuw naar het Heilige land trokken."

Potestaats of Friesland
1167 deaths
Year of birth unknown